Trevor K. Wilson (born March 9, 1981), known professionally as K. Trevor Wilson, is a Canadian comedian, writer and actor. He grew up in Toronto, Ontario and is best known as the character Squirrely Dan in Letterkenny.

Career

Standup comedy
In 2012, Wilson won the Irwin Barker Home Grown Award at the Just For Laughs Festival in Montreal. He's since appeared multiple times at the festival as well as JFL 42, Winnipeg Comedy Festival, Halifax Comedy Festival and performed on Jimmy Kimmel Live and Comedy Central's Roast Battle.

His debut album SexCop Fire Penis reached the top of the iTunes Comedy Charts and won Best Taped Live Performance at the 2015 Canadian Comedy Awards. His follow up, Sorry! (A Canadian Album), debuted at the top of the iTunes Comedy Charts and was nominated for the Juno Award for Comedy Album of the Year.

In 2017, his first special, Bigger in Person, debuted on The Comedy Network. Wilson was also featured in the Netflix Series, Comedians of The World that was released January 1, 2019.

Wilson is an original member of the Comedy Records Roster and was featured on the label's 10 Year Anniversary album.

In 2021 he was announced as one of the judges in the upcoming first season of Roast Battle Canada. In 2022, he appeared in LOL: Last One Laughing Canada.

Acting
As a child actor, Wilson was featured multiple times on the Canadian series Goosebumps. In 2010, he stood alongside Nelly Furtado in the film Score: A Hockey Musical and has since been part of multiple series including What Would Sal Do? and Man Seeking Woman.

In 2016, Wilson debuted as Squirrely Dan on Crave's Letterkenny.

At the 6th Canadian Screen Awards, Wilson received a nomination for Best Supporting Actor in a Comedy Series.

Personal life
He graduated from the Etobicoke School of the Arts as well as Humber College.

Wilson chose the stage name "K. Trevor Wilson"—transposing his given name and middle initial—at the suggestion of his agent when he registered with ACTRA, because there was already another member with the name "Trevor Wilson".

See also
List of Canadian comedians
Comedy Records

References

External links
 
 

1980 births
Living people
Canadian stand-up comedians
Canadian male television actors
Comedians from Toronto
Canadian male comedians
Male actors from Toronto
21st-century Canadian comedians
21st-century Canadian male actors
Canadian Comedy Award winners